CBS Overnight News is an American overnight news broadcasting that is broadcast on CBS during the early morning hours each Monday through Friday. The program maintains a infotainment format, incorporating national, international and business news headlines; feature reports; interviews; national weather forecasts; sports highlights; and commentary. CBS has carried an overnight news block since 1982; it was known as CBS News Nightwatch until 1992 and then Up to the Minute until September 18, 2015.

CBS Overnight News draws from the full resources of CBS News, including the CBS Evening News, CBS Mornings, Newspath, owned-and-operated station and network affiliate of the television network and Associated Press Television News. It also featured rebroadcasts of selected stories from CBS News Sunday Morning, 48 Hours, 60 Minutes and Face the Nation.

Overview
CBS Overnight News broadcasts beginning at 2:00 a.m. ET and is transmitted in a continuous one-hour broadcast delay loop until 8:00 a.m. ET when the CBS Morning News – the network's early-morning news program – begins in certain areas of the Pacific Time Zone. (Most CBS stations air the CBS Morning News at 4:00 a.m. local time or earlier, depending on the start time of the station's local breakfast television). Most of the network's stations do not air the program's entire broadcast loop and preempt portions of it in order to air local programming (usually infomercial or broadcast syndication) – joining the program in progress anywhere from five minutes to as much as 1½ hours after the start of the program – with affiliates looping the show until the CBS Morning News begins. Some stations and affiliates, including CBS Television Stations, carry a rebroadcast of the CBS Evening News in the first half-hour they air or leading into their morning newscasts (except Sunday into Monday morning, when the Sunday edition of the CBS Weekend News is substituted). This scheduling began during the COVID-19 pandemic in March 2020, due to the CBS Broadcast Center's circumstances at the time where all personnel was working remotely and the building was dark for deep disinfection, requiring the Morning News to go on a hiatus which has continued on into the summer.

Its main competitor is ABC's World News Now, which follows a more irreverent format than the more straightforward news style of CBS (NBC has not aired a late-night newscast since the cancellation of NBC Nightside in 1998, and locally-scheduled syndicated programming or NBC News Now's Top Story with Tom Llamas leads into Early Today).

History

The program's history traces back to the launch of the network's first overnight news program, CBS News Nightwatch, which premiered on October 3, 1982; that program was originally anchored by Christopher Glenn, Felicia Jeter, Karen Stone and Harold Dow, who were later joined by Mary Jo West. In 1984, production of Nightwatch moved from New York City to Washington, D.C., at which time Charlie Rose (who later returned to CBS News as co-anchor of CBS This Morning) and Lark McCarthy became the program's anchors. Nightwatch'''s format was a hybrid of a traditional newscast and an interview and debate show; during the original 1982 format, local affiliates had the option of inserting local news updates into the program.

Up to the Minute
CBS announced its decision to cancel CBS News Nightwatch in early 1992. Around this time, ABC and NBC were setting up their own late-night newscast programs (World News Now and NBC Nightside, respectively; only World News Now is still on the air) and replaced it with a more traditional news program in the same vein as the other two, titled Up to the Minute, on March 30, 1992. The program was originally anchored by Russ Mitchell and Monica Gayle, who both left the program in 1993 (Gayle subsequently became co-anchor of the CBS Morning News), and were replaced by Troy Roberts, at which point the program switched to the single-anchor format which it used for the rest of its run; production of the newscast returned to the CBS Broadcast Center in New York, situated in front of a working newsroom used by the affiliate news service CBS Newspath. Regular on-air contributors to Up to the Minute included John Quain, who served as the program's technology consultant beginning in 1998.

The program's on-air graphics package and set were often several years behind that of CBS News' daytime broadcasts, with components of the news division's early-1990s era graphics package being used on the program well past 2000. These graphics were updated in 2005, 2006, 2009, and then again in 2011 to match the current look of the CBS Evening News. The newsroom behind the anchors was also covered by frosted-glass paneling, likely to hide the equally-outdated CBS News and Up to the Minute branding mounted along the walls. In March 2009, when Michelle Gielan was named anchor of Up to the Minute, production of the program was integrated with the CBS Morning News, with the same anchors being used on both programs.

In November 2012, Up to the Minute became the last remaining news program on any of the Big Three TV Networks or major cable news channels to begin broadcasting in high-definition television; at that time, production of the program was moved to Studio 57 at the CBS Broadcast Center, the same studio space that is also home to CBS This Morning. Until then, Up to the Minute had continued to broadcast in standard-definition television (by comparison, the CBS Morning News had upgraded to HD two years earlier in November 2010).

CBS Overnight News
On June 25, 2015, Newsday reported that CBS News had decided to cancel Up to the Minute but planned on retaining the 3 a.m. timeslot for news programming. Up to the Minute ended its run after 23 years on September 18, 2015. The program was replaced three days later on September 21 by the CBS Overnight News, a rebranding made primarily to be consistent with the rest of CBS News; in terms of content, the show is largely unchanged from its predecessor.

The primary change is that there is no live anchor. Instead, the regular anchor from the previous day's CBS Weekend News (on Sunday night into Monday morning) and CBS Evening News (for the remainder of the week) "hosts" the program along with various fill-in CBS News correspondents via introducing stories rebroadcast from the West Coast final edition of the Evening News and additional content. The CBS Evening News branding remains on the story packages. The Overnight News'' room is staffed to accommodate breaking news at all times.

Anchors
 Russ Mitchell (1992–1993; now with WKYC in Cleveland)
 Monica Gayle (1992–1993; later with WJBK in Detroit; now retired)
 Troy Roberts (1993–1995; now a correspondent for 48 Hours)
 Sharyl Attkisson (1993–1995; now with WSYX in Columbus, Ohio and special correspondent for Sinclair Broadcast Group)
 Nanette Hansen (1995–1998)
 Mika Brzezinski (1997–2000; now with MSNBC)
 Melissa McDermott (2000 – March 10, 2006)
 Meg Oliver (March 20, 2006 – March 20, 2009)
 Michelle Gielan (March 23, 2009 – June 18, 2010)
 Betty Nguyen (June 21, 2010 – April 6, 2012; later with NBC News; now a morning co-anchor at WPIX-TV in New York City)
 Terrell Brown (April 9, 2012 – January 18, 2013; now with WLS-TV in Chicago)
 Anne-Marie Green (January 21, 2013 – September 18, 2015)
 Jeff Glor (September 21, 2015 – May 2, 2016; December 5, 2017 – May 10, 2019)
 Scott Pelley (September 22, 2015 – June 16, 2017)
 Elaine Quijano (May 9, 2016 – June 1, 2020)
 Anthony Mason (June 20, 2017 – December 1, 2017)
 Norah O'Donnell (July 16, 2019 – present)
 Jericka Duncan (December 7, 2020 – present)

References

External links
 

CBS original programming
1982 American television series debuts
1980s American late-night television series
1990s American late-night television series
2000s American late-night television series
2010s American late-night television series
2020s American late-night television series
1980s American television news shows
1990s American television news shows
2000s American television news shows
2010s American television news shows
2020s American television news shows
CBS News
English-language television shows
Television shows filmed in New York City